O Invasor (English: The Trespasser) is a 2002 Brazilian drama film directed by Beto Brant. It is an adaptation of the book of the same name, written by Marçal Aquino.

Cast 
Marco Ricca as Ivan Soares
Alexandre Borges as Gilberto
Mariana Ximenes as Marina
Paulo Miklos as Anísio
Malu Mader as Cláudia
George Freire as Estevão
Chris Couto as Cecília
Sabotage as himself

Awards 
2001: Festival de Brasília
Best Director (won)
Best Score (won)
Best Film (won; Critics Award)

2002: Bogota Film Festival
Best Film (Nominee)

2002: Havana Film Festival
Grand Coral - Third Prize (won)

Remake
A French remake entitled  was released in 2019.

References

External links 
 

2002 films
2000s Portuguese-language films
Brazilian drama films
Best Picture APCA Award winners
2002 drama films